Liquibase is an open-source database-independent library for tracking, managing and applying database schema changes.  It was started in 2006 to allow easier tracking of database changes, especially in an agile software development environment.

Overview 

All changes to the database are stored in text files (XML, YAML, JSON or SQL) and identified by a combination of an "id" and "author" tag as well as the name of the file itself.  A list of all applied changes is stored in each database which is consulted on all database updates to determine what new changes need to be applied.  As a result, there is no database version number but this approach allows it to work in environments with multiple developers and code branches.

Liquibase automatically creates DatabaseChangeLog Table and DatabaseChangeLogLock Table when you first execute a changeLog File.

Major functionality 

The following is a list of major features:

 Over 30 built-in database refactorings
 Extensibility to create custom changes
 Update database to current version
 Rollback last X changes to database
 Rollback database changes to particular date/time
 Rollback database to "tag"
 SQL for Database Updates and Rollbacks can be saved for manual review
 Stand-alone IDE and Eclipse plug-in
 "Contexts" for including/excluding change sets to execute
 Database diff report
 Database diff changelog generation
 Ability to create changelog to generate an existing database
 Database change documentation generation
 DBMS Check, user check, and SQL check preconditions
 Ability to split change log into multiple files for easier management
 Executable via command line, Apache Ant, Apache Maven, servlet container, or Spring Framework.
 Support for 10 database systems

Commercial version 
Liquibase (formerly Datical) is both the largest contributor to the Liquibase project and the developer of Liquibase Enterprise  – a commercial product which provides the core Liquibase functionality plus additional features.

 Change Forecasting: Forecast upcoming changes to be executed before they are run to determine how those changes will impact your data.
 Rules Engine to enforce Corporate Standards and Policies.   
 Supports database Stored Logic: functions, stored procedures, packages, table spaces, triggers, sequences, user defined types, synonyms, etc. 
 Compare Databases enables you to compare two database schemas to identify change and easily move it to your change log.
 Change Set Wizard to easily define and capture database changes in a database neutral manner.
 Deployment Plan Wizard for modeling and managing your logical deployment workflow
 Plug-ins to Jenkins, Bamboo, UrbanCode, CA Release Automation (Nolio), Serena Release Automation, BMC Bladelogic, Puppet, Chef, as well all popular source control systems like SVN, Git, TFS, CVS, etc.

Liquibase products, including Liquibase Enterprise (formerly known as Datical DB), are used by DBAs, Release Managers, DevOps teams, Application Owners, Architects, and Developers involved in the Application Release process. It manages Database Schema changes together with application code in a programmatic fashion that eliminates errors and delays and enables rapid Agile releases. Liquibase commercial products build upon the Liquibase Data Model Approach for managing data structure specific content across application versions as they advance from Development to Test to Production environments. Datical previews the impact of Schema changes in any environment before deployment thus mitigating risk and resulting in smoother and faster application changes.

Liquibase developer, Nathan Voxland, is an executive at Liquibase (formerly Datical).

Sample Liquibase changelog file 
<?xml version="1.0" encoding="UTF-8"?>

<databaseChangeLog
        xmlns="http://www.liquibase.org/xml/ns/dbchangelog/1.3"
        xmlns:xsi="http://www.w3.org/2001/XMLSchema-instance"
        xsi:schemaLocation="http://www.liquibase.org/xml/ns/dbchangelog/1.3
        http://www.liquibase.org/xml/ns/dbchangelog/dbchangelog-1.3.xsd">
    <preConditions>
            <dbms type="oracle"/>
    </preConditions>

    <changeSet id="1" author="author1">
        <createTable tableName="persons">
            <column name="id" type="int" autoIncrement="true">
                <constraints primaryKey="true" nullable="false"/>
            </column>
            <column name="name" type="varchar(50)"/>
        </createTable>
    </changeSet>

    <changeSet id="2" author="author2" context="test">
        <insert tableName="persons">
            <column name="id" value="1"/>
            <column name="name" value="Test1"/>
        </insert>
        <insert tableName="persons">
            <column name="id" value="2"/>
            <column name="name" value="Test2"/>
        </insert>
    </changeSet>
</databaseChangeLog>

Related tools
 Flyway
 alembic
 DBmaestro

References

External links
 

Database administration tools
Java platform
Agile software development